Hashim Khamis Hassan  is an Iraqi football goalkeeper who played for the Iraq in the 2000 Asian Cup. He also played for Al-Quwa Al-Jawiya. He is known as Hashim Tayara (aeroplane).

Hashim Khamis arrived onto the international scene in 1993, but only became a regular under Najih Humoud six years later at the 2000 Asian Cup qualifiers.

Iraqi legend Habib Jafar once described him as being around the same level as Mohamad Al-Daeyea; the Saudi Arabian goalkeeper widely recognised as one of the best keepers in Asia.

Hashim was heavily criticised for Iraq’s 4-1 defeat in the 2000 Asian Cup quarterfinals by Japan and was one of the many players including Essam Hamad and Hussam Fawzi that were later dropped by coach Milan Zivadinovic during the naming of Iraq’s 2002 World Cup qualifying squad. He was also flogged for three days under orders from Uday Hussein for losing in the quarterfinals.

References

External links
 

Iraqi footballers
Iraq international footballers
2000 AFC Asian Cup players
Living people
Association football goalkeepers
Al-Quwa Al-Jawiya players
salam Zgharta FC players
Akhaa Ahli Aley FC players
1969 births